Stephen Cantwell (born 11 August 1996) is an English former first-class cricketer.

Cantwell was born at Durham in August 1996. He was educated there at St Leonard's Catholic School, before going up to the University of Leeds. While studying at Leeds, he played two first-class cricket matches for Leeds/Bradford MCCU against Derbyshire and Yorkshire in 2019. He scored 73 runs in his two matches, with a high score of 43, while with his right-arm fast-medium bowling, he took 2 wickets from 55 overs bowled and 185 runs conceded.

References

External links

1996 births
Living people
Sportspeople from Durham, England
Cricketers from County Durham
Alumni of the University of Leeds
English cricketers
Leeds/Bradford MCCU cricketers